Marcus John Schlesinger (born 16 November 1991) is an Israeli swimmer. He competed in the men's 50 metre butterfly event at the 2017 World Aquatics Championships.

See also
List of Israeli records in swimming

References

1991 births
Living people
Israeli male swimmers
Place of birth missing (living people)
Male butterfly swimmers